Lapat Ngamchaweng (born 24 November 1998); popularly known by the nickname Third is a Thai singer, actor, brand endorser and model. He was a former artist under Kamikaze and a former member of Nine by Nine. He is currently a member of the Thai boy group TRINITY.

Early life and education
Lapat was born on 24 November 1998 in Bangkok, Thailand. His mother is Ketsara Limpananon. He is the youngest of three siblings, having two older sisters named Larisa Ngamchaweng (Lyly) and Larisara Ngamchaweng (Biba). He attended New Sathorn International School and graduated from the Faculty of Communication Arts at Chulalongkorn University in 2020.

Career

Lapat became interested in acting at an early age. He first appeared in a 2012 Thai remake of Romeo and Juliet, playing the child lead actor. But he chose to pursue his singing career as he signed under the record label Kamikaze in 2013.

He released his debut single "Reminder" as Third Kamikaze on 27 August 2014. The music video has earned 341 million views on YouTube as of October 2022, making it the most-watched video of the label on the platform to date, and the 29th most viewed YouTube video in Thailand. Due to its success, it is deemed as a modern T-pop hit. He frequently collaborated with other Kamikaze artists for singles such as "Following" and "Hidden Love".

Lapat starred in a short film entitled 5 Degrees 37 Minutes (2016), a film honoring King Bhumibol Adulyadej. He played the role of Kla in the segment "The Brave Things".

His fifth single "Love Warning" was released in January 2016. Its music video became one of the most-watched videos of Kamikaze on Youtube, with over 237 million views as of October 2022. Lapat's sixth and last single with the label is "Stay", released on 9 March 2017 and became one of the soundtracks of the mini-series 21 Days, I Love You (2017), in which he starred with other Kamikaze artists. He stayed with the label until its closure in November 2017. 

Lapat signed under 4NOLOGUE in 2018 where he became a member of the group Nine by Nine. As part of the project, he starred in two TV series entitled In Family We Trust (2018), playing the role of "Tao" and in Great Men Academy (2019) as "Nuclear".

After the project, he debuted as one of the members of TRINITY in 2019 along with former Nine by Nine co-members Teeradon Supapunpinyo, Sivakorn Adulsuttikul, and Jackrin Kungwankiatichai. He also appeared in the ninth season of The Mask Singer Thailand as Firework Mask.

Lapat's major film debut came with Mother Gamer (2020), where he starred as an e-sports player named "Kobsak". He received positive response for his performance and earned him Best Actor nominations at the 17th Komchadluek Awards and 11th Thai Film Directors Association.

He played the main role in the 2022 Thai TV series To My Puzzle Pieces as "Key".

On 16 October 2022, Lapat performed as a special guest during the Kamikaze Party 2022, where he performed his solo singles "Reminder" and "Love Warning".

Filmography

Film

Television

Web series

Discography

Awards and nominations

References

External links 

Lapat Ngamchaweng
Lapat Ngamchaweng
1998 births
Living people
Lapat Ngamchaweng
Lapat Ngamchaweng
Lapat Ngamchaweng
Lapat Ngamchaweng
Lapat Ngamchaweng